Tessella sertata is a moth in the family Erebidae. It was described by Carlos Berg in 1882. It is found in Uruguay, Argentina and the Brazilian states of Espírito Santo, Santa Catarina and Rio Grande do Sul.

References

Moths described in 1882
Phaegopterina